Luca Patuelli (born July 28, 1984, in Montreal, Quebec), nicknamed Lazylegz, is a Canadian b-boy.

He was born with Arthrogryposis (multiplex congenital), a muscle disorder which affects his legs.
He graduated from Concordia University in Montreal with a BComm in 2009.
Patuelli performed at the 2010 Winter Paralympics opening ceremony in Vancouver.

In 2015, he was awarded a Meritous Service Decoration for his work making dance more accessible to those with physical disabilities.

References

External links
 Official website

America's Got Talent contestants
Canadian breakdancers
Entertainers from Montreal
People with arthrogryposis
1984 births
Living people
21st-century Canadian dancers